Songs of Innocence and of Experience is an illustrated collection of poems by William Blake in two volumes.

Songs of Innocence and of Experience and variants may also refer to:

Music
Songs of Innocence and Experience (Allen Ginsberg album)
Songs of Innocence and of Experience (Adequate Seven album)
Songs of Innocence and of Experience (Greg Brown album), 1986
Songs of Innocence (U2 album), 2014
Songs of Experience (U2 album), 2017
Songs of Innocence and of Experience, Grammy-winning 2005 classical album of musical setting of Blake's poems by William Bolcom, also known as Bolcom: Songs of Innocence and of Experience
Songs of Innocence and Experience, album by Caprice
Songs of Innocence and Experience, album by The Echoing Green
Songs of Innocence and Experience, album by The Emotions, 1972
Songs of Innocence & Experience, album by Walter Zimmermann

See also
Songs of Experience (disambiguation)
Songs of Innocence (disambiguation)